Xu Dan (born April 13, 1969 in Changchun, Jilin) is a male Chinese sports shooter, specializing in 50 metre pistol, who competed in the 1996 Summer Olympics, in the 2000 Summer Olympics, and in the 2004 Summer Olympics.

References

External links
 profile

1969 births
Living people
Chinese male sport shooters
ISSF pistol shooters
Olympic shooters of China
Sportspeople from Changchun
Shooters at the 1996 Summer Olympics
Shooters at the 2000 Summer Olympics
Shooters at the 2004 Summer Olympics
Asian Games medalists in shooting
Sport shooters from Jilin
Shooters at the 1994 Asian Games
Shooters at the 1998 Asian Games
Shooters at the 2002 Asian Games
Asian Games gold medalists for China
Asian Games bronze medalists for China
Medalists at the 1994 Asian Games
Medalists at the 1998 Asian Games
Medalists at the 2002 Asian Games
20th-century Chinese people
21st-century Chinese people